Joanna Olczak-Ronikier (born 12 November 1934) is a Polish writer and scenarist, co-founder of the Piwnica pod Baranami cabaret in Kraków.

Biography 
Joanna Olczak was born on 12 November 1934 in Warsaw to a Polish-Jewish family, as a daughter of Tadeusz Olczak and Hanna Mortkowicz (1905–1968), famous poet and writer. Her maternal grandmother Janina de domo Horwitz (1875–1960) also was a writer, while her husband Jakób Mortkowicz (1876–1931) was a book publisher. Joanna Olczak-Ronikier is also related with Maksymilian Horwitz, a politician, and Kamilla Kancewicz, a doctor.

In 1994 she wrote a monograph about Piwnica pod Baranami and four years later a biography of Piotr Skrzynecki, founder of this cabaret. Olczak-Ronikier is also an author of many dramas, including Ja-Napoleon (Teatr Dramatyczny, Warsaw; 1968) and Z biegiem lat, z biegiem dni... (Teatr Stary, Cracow; 1978).

In 2002 her memoir about her family's history W ogrodzie pamięci won the Nike Award and in 2011 she received the Klio Award for Janusz Korczak biography, Korczak. Próba biografii.

She was married twice: with a German journalist Ludwig Zimmerer (1924–1987), they had one daughter, Katarzyna Zimmerer (born in 1961); and with a Polish translator Michał Ronikier (born in 1939).

References

Polish women writers
1934 births
Living people
20th-century Polish Jews
21st-century Polish Jews
Jewish Polish writers
Nike Award winners